Toothache tree may refer to one of several American trees:
 Aralia spinosa (also called angelica tree, devil's walking stick, prickly ash)
 Zanthoxylum clava-herculis (also called pepperwood, Southern prickly ash) or Zanthoxylum americanum (Northern prickly ash).

References